La Alta Escuela was one of the pioneering formations of the rap in Sevilla, Spain. Formed by Tote King (mc), Juaninacka (mc) together with Juanma (MC) (mc), Dj Randy (dj) and El Tralla (mc) (the one who left the group before extracting his only one LP En pie de vuelo).

Biography 
They began as a group of several friends doing music to amuse their selves. It was consisting of Tote King, Juaninacka, Juanma and Dj Randy. They had in project extract a model but Acción Sánchez listened to his work and thanks to him they obtained the necessary contact to turn the above-mentioned model in what it would be his first and only one LP En pie de vuelo (1999). This work today is considered by some as the classic one of the Spanish hip-hop, in spite of small repercussion that had in his moment. 
The group dissolved between other reasons due to the fact that the distance was complicating them to realize the tests. Nowadays every component follows his career in the world of the hip-hop with his own projects.

Return 
In November, 2008 Tote King confirmed that it will return to launch a disc together with Juaninacka, Juanma (MC) y DJ Randy as La Alta Escuela coming soon. In addition in Tote King last LP we find a so-called topic "La Reunión", in which Juaninacka collaborates, referring to the return of the group. And in the LP 41100 Juaninacka's Rock can listen to a qualified topic "La Alta Escuela rulez" in which they inform all the members of the group.

Discography 
 "En pie de vuelo(flight stand)" (LP) (Flow Records, 1999)

Solo discographies

Juaninacka 
 "El Japones (the Japanese)" (Promo) (2002)
 "Versión EP (EP version)" (EP) (Fiebre Records, 2003)
 "Caleidoscopio  (kaleidoscope)" (LP) (Fiebre Records, 2004)
 "El Hombre(The man)" (Maxi) (Fiebre Records, 2005)
 "Luces de Neón (neon lights)" (LP) (Fiebre Records, 2006)
 "Good Musica(good music)" (Maqueta) (2007)
 ¨"41100 Rock" (LP) (Boa Music) (2009)
 ¨"Canciones de Ahora y Siempre(Now and forever songs)" (Mixtape free download) (2010)
 "Hellboyz" (LP) (Producida por aisho, (2011)

 Con Billy el Niño y Don Dinero 
 "Otra historia de Coria...(another story of Coria)" (Maxi) (Flow Records, 2000)

 Juanma (MC) 
 "El que faltaba(Which Lacked" (EP) (edison naula, 2005)

 Tote King 
 "Big King XXL" (Maketa) (Flow Records, 2001)
 "Duermen(sleep)" (Maxi) (Yo Gano - SuperEgo, 2001)
 "Matemáticas(Math)" (Maxi) (Yo Gano - SuperEgo, 2004)
 "Música para enfermos(Music for sick)" (LP) (SuperEgo, 2004)
 "Un tipo cualquiera(Some guy)" (LP) (BOA, 2006)
 "T.O.T.E." (LP) (BOA, 2008)
 "El lado oscuro de Gandhi(The Dark side of Gandhi)" (LP) (Sony Music, 5 October 2010)

 Con ToteKing & Shotta 
 "Nada pa mi (nothing for me)" (Maxi) (Yo Gano - SuperEgo, 2002)
 "Tu madre es una foca(yor mother is a seal)" (LP) (Yo Gano - SuperEgo, 2002)
tengo que volver a casa (I have to go home) (coming soon)

 Dj Randy 
 "Un peso pesado (a heavyweight)" (2008)

 Con Billy el Niño y Don Dinero 
 "Otra historia de Coria...(Anothes story of Coria)" (Maxi) (Flow Records, 2000)

 El Tralla 

 "en la Calle(In the street)" (Maqueta) (2001)
 "La Calle En Demo(In the street demo)" (Maqueta) (2002)
 "Las Calles Hablan(the streets talks)''" (Maxi Single) (Fiebre Records), (2006)

See also 
 Spanish hip hop
 Juaninacka
 Tote King
 Juanma (MC)

Spanish hip hop groups